KCWE (channel 29) is a television station in Kansas City, Missouri, United States, affiliated with The CW. It is owned by Hearst Television alongside ABC affiliate KMBC-TV (channel 9). Both stations share studios on Winchester Avenue in the Ridge-Winchester section of Kansas City, Missouri, while KCWE's transmitter is located in the city's Blue Valley section.

KCWE also serves as an alternate CW affiliate for the St. Joseph market, as the station's transmitter produces a city-grade signal that reaches St. Joseph proper and rural areas in the market's central and southern counties. It previously served as the default CW station for St. Joseph until June 2, 2012, when Fox affiliate KNPN-LD (channel 26) signed on with a CW+-affiliated digital subchannel on virtual channel 26.2, resulting in KCWE's displacement from Suddenlink Communications and smaller cable providers in the market (originating as cable-only "WBJO" prior to then, the News-Press & Gazette Company—which took over that channel's operations—moved the CW affiliation in St. Joseph to low-power station KBJO-LD (channel 21, now KNPG-LD) in March 2013, eventually moving to its 21.2 subchannel when that station's main feed switched to NBC on November 1, 2016).

History

Prior history of channel 29 in Kansas City
The UHF channel 29 allocation in the Kansas City market was originally occupied by K29CF (now Univision affiliate KUKC-LD on channel 20), a low-power station that was affiliated with the home shopping network ValueVision. That station eventually moved to UHF channel 48 in early 1996, changing its call letters to K48FS, after Channel 29, LLC (owned by Kansas City native and television executive David Salzman and his wife, Sonia Salzman, KCWB president Bob Liepold and Thomas B. Jones, owner of Bardstown, Kentucky-based American Chestnut Television) received approval of a construction permit by the Federal Communications Commission (FCC) to build a new full-power station on channel 29.

KCWE station history

Early years: as a WB affiliate
Channel 29, as a full-power outlet, first signed on the air on September 14, 1996, as KCWB (standing for "Kansas City's WB"). Originally serving as an affiliate of The WB Television Network, a joint venture between Time Warner and Tribune Broadcasting (which would eventually purchase Fox affiliate WDAF-TV (channel 4) in July 2013), Channel 29, LLC owned the station's license but turned over its non-license assets to the Hearst Corporation—which had owned ABC affiliate KMBC-TV since 1982—through a local marketing agreement that was reached shortly before KCWB's launch. For the first 18 months of the network's existence, residents in the Kansas City market were only able to view programming from The WB through the superstation feed of the network's Chicago affiliate WGN-TV, now standalone cable channel NewsNation, on local cable and satellite providers. The station originally operated from KMBC's studio facilities in the underground floors of the Lyric Theatre at the intersection of East 18th Street and Central Avenue in Downtown Kansas City.

Alongside WB prime time programming and a blend of cartoons from both the network's children's program block, Kids' WB, and those acquired via syndication, KCWB initially carried recent off-network sitcoms and drama series, and some first-run syndicated scripted programs, talk shows, court shows and reality-based lifestyle and documentary series, including some series that had not been able to receive clearance in the market previously due to the lack of available time slot clearances on Kansas City's four major network affiliates—KMBC, WDAF-TV, CBS affiliate KCTV (channel 5) and NBC affiliate KSHB-TV (channel 41)—as well as Home Shopping Network affiliate/part-time independent station KMCI-TV (channel 38, now a full-time independent) and UPN affiliate KSMO-TV (channel 62).

As was typical of WB-affiliated stations of the period, KCWB filled the 7:00 to 9:00 p.m. time slot with feature films and first-run syndicated programs as The WB had only maintained a lineup of prime time programs on Sunday and Wednesday nights and, around the time the station launched, had also just debuted an evening block on Mondays; this would become less of an issue as The WB launched additional nights of programming over the next four years, adopting a six-night weekly schedule in September 1999 (running Sunday through Fridays). In the spring of 1997, after Argyle Television Holdings II merged with the Hearst Corporation's broadcasting division, Hearst transferred KCWB's operations to its broadcasting division, Hearst-Argyle Television (now Hearst Television). For most of its tenure as a WB affiliate, KCWB's logo under the initial "WB29" branding was similar in style to the "WB32" logo used by Tampa, Florida sister station WWWB-TV.

As a UPN affiliate
On July 21, 1997, the Sinclair Broadcast Group signed a long-term affiliation agreement with WB co-parent Time Warner, under which the group committed five of its UPN-affiliated stations and three independent stations to become affiliates of The WB, an agreement that came as Sinclair had entered into a programming dispute with the network (ironically, Sinclair would later acquire several UPN affiliates through its purchases of stations from Max Media and Sullivan Broadcasting the following year). One of the stations involved in the deal was KSMO, which had been a charter affiliate of UPN since that network launched on January 16, 1995. On March 24, 1998, American Chestnut Television announced that it had reached an agreement with UPN to move the network's Kansas City affiliation to KCWB.

Channel 29 took over as the market's UPN affiliate on March 30, at which time the station changed its branding to "KC29". However, even though KSMO concurrently took over the WB affiliation on that date, KCWE chose to retain the local programming rights to the Kids' WB programming block in the interim partly because of that station's existing rights to the Fox Kids lineup, which KSMO had carried since September 1994 through an agreement between Sinclair and Fox (WDAF-TV had declined to carry Fox Kids upon becoming a Fox affiliate, a situation that would become commonplace among its then-sister stations that joined Fox through the network's affiliation deal with New World Communications). The rights to the Kids' WB and Fox Kids blocks would eventually transfer between the two stations in June 1998, when KCWB took over the local rights to Fox Kids at the same time that KSMO began clearing the entire WB programming lineup when it added the Kids' WB weekday and Saturday lineups to its schedule. The assumption of Fox Kids gave KCWB an expanded inventory of children's programming; the station carried the weekday morning blocks of Fox Kids and UPN Kids (which was replaced by Disney's One Too in August 1999) together on Monday through Friday mornings, with the two-hour UPN block being separated into two one-hour blocks bookending the Fox Kids programs, while Fox Kids' weekday afternoon and Saturday morning blocks aired in pattern and the UPN Kids weekend block aired in its normal Sunday time slot.

On August 24, 1998, Channel 29 changed its call letters to KCWE (a modification of its original calls, and standing for "Kansas City's World of Entertainment"). On January 1, 2000, the station realigned its branding to once again match its Tampa sister (by then WMOR-TV, now an independent station), identifying on-air as "MOREtv 29". Alongside UPN prime time programming and a blend of cartoons and a few live-action children's shows from both Fox Kids and UPN Kids, KCWE carried some recent off-network sitcoms and drama series, movies on weekend afternoons and evenings, some first-run syndicated shows, and overnight programming from the Shop at Home Network.

KCWE's programming focus would gradually shift over time; in September 1999, KMCI assumed the local rights to Fox Kids, where the block and its successor, FoxBox/4KidsTV, remained until Fox stopped providing children's programs within its schedule in December 2008. Channel 29 ceased carrying children's programs on weekdays altogether by August 2003, after UPN's decision not to renew its time-lease agreement with Buena Vista Television resulted in Disney's One Too being discontinued, with the network turning over the time allocated to that block to its affiliates. As it had done after dropping Fox Kids, KCWE acquired additional first-run talk and reality programs to fill the vacated time slots; the only children's program offerings that were carried on KCWE afterward were acquisitions from the syndication market.

In early October 1999, the Salzmans—through their television station group, Qwest Broadcasting, which also owned WB affiliates WATL (now a MyNetworkTV affiliate) in Atlanta and WNOL-TV (now a CW affiliate) in New Orleans through an outsourcing agreement with Tribune Broadcasting—purchased Liepold's controlling 51% interest and Jones' 9% interest in KCWE in an all-stock transaction for $558,000. Hearst would purchase the station outright in 2001, creating Kansas City's first television duopoly; however, Hearst-Argyle continued to structure its control of KCWE as a management arrangement rather than direct ownership for several years afterward, as the station was nominally owned by an indirect subsidiary of the Hearst Corporation doing business as "KCWE-TV Company", instead of its Hearst-Argyle broadcasting division (which at the time, was a publicly traded company controlled by Hearst). In September 2005, the station changed its on-air branding to "KCWE, Kansas City's UPN", using a modified version of the "MOREtv" logo design (KMBC would resurrect the former "MOREtv" branding on September 14, 2010, when it launched "MOREtv Kansas City," a weekday-only prime time block of general entertainment programs that aired on digital subchannel 9.2 until it switched affiliations from The Local AccuWeather Channel to MeTV on June 21, 2011).

As a CW affiliate
On January 24, 2006, the respective parent companies of UPN and The WB, CBS Corporation and the Warner Bros. Entertainment division of Time Warner, announced that they would dissolve the two networks to create The CW Television Network, a joint venture between Time Warner and CBS that initially featured programs from its two predecessor networks as well as new series specifically produced for The CW. Subsequently, on February 22, 2006, News Corporation announced the launch of MyNetworkTV, a network operated by Fox Television Stations and its syndication division Twentieth Television that was created to primarily to provide network programming to UPN and WB stations with which The CW decided against affiliating based on their local viewership standing in comparison to the outlet that the network ultimately chose, allowing these stations another option besides converting to independent stations.

On March 7, 2006, in a joint announcement by the network and Hearst-Argyle Television, KCWE was confirmed as The CW's Kansas City charter affiliate. Since the network chose its charter stations based on which of them among The WB and UPN's respective affiliate bodies was the highest-rated in each market, KCWE was chosen to join The CW over KSMO as—at the time of the agreement—it had been the higher-rated of the two stations, despite channel 62 having signed on thirteen years before the full-power Channel 29 debuted; KMCI also vied for the CW affiliation, although it likely would not have obtained the affiliation in any event. Two days later on March 9, the Meredith Corporation announced that it had signed KSMO to an affiliation agreement with the Fox Entertainment Group to become the market's MyNetworkTV affiliate, as part of a deal that also saw its UPN-affiliated sister station, KPDX-TV in Portland, Oregon (which was passed over for the CW affiliation in that market in favor of Tribune-owned WB affiliate KWBP, now KRCW-TV), being committed to join the network.

As the station already had the "CW" initialism in its call letters, KMBC/KCWE management stated that it would take advantage of this fact for branding purposes and retain the existing KCWE callsign. KCWE adopted a new wordmark logo based around and inspired by the network's logo design that August, at which time the station changed its on-air branding to "KCWE, Kansas City's CW"; however it officially remained a UPN affiliate until September 15, 2006, before affiliating with The CW when that network debuted on September 18. KSMO, meanwhile, joined MyNetworkTV upon that network's launch on September 5, although it remained a part-time affiliate of The WB—carrying only the Daytime WB block for the remaining two weeks of that network's operation—through September 15.

On August 23, 2007, KMBC and KCWE moved their operations into a new  facility at the Winchester Business Center (located at 6455 Winchester Avenue, near Swope Park) in southeastern Kansas City, Missouri. Announced in 2002, construction of the facility—which was designed in the mold of the Spanish-inspired architectural style of Country Club Plaza, and built by Oklahoma City-based architecture firm Rees and Associates, which also designed the studio facilities of sister stations WDSU in New Orleans and WESH in Orlando—began in June 2005, and was completed in early August 2007. The modern purpose-built concrete and glass studio facility incorporates a master control facility with digital and high definition transmission processing equipment; a two-story  production studio; an expanded  newsroom; a satellite management center supporting downlink and uplink capabilities; a helistop for KMBC's "NewsChopper 9" helicopter; and surface parking for station employees and guests. The move of operations of KMBC and KCWE formally migrated to the Winchester Avenue studio ended KMBC's 54-year tenure at the Lyric Theatre, which had earlier been sold by the Lyric Opera to real estate firm DST Realty.

In late March 2010, the Hearst Corporation filed an application with the FCC to transfer the KCWE license from the KCWE-TV Company subsidiary to the Hearst Television unit; the transfer was completed on May 1 of that year, officially making KMBC-TV and KCWE directly owned sister stations. After the transaction was finalized, KCWE's designated licensee, "Hearst Stations Inc." began to be used as the default licensee name identified in the copyright tag displayed at the end of KMBC-produced newscasts on both station, even though "KMBC Hearst Television Inc." remains the licensing purpose corporation for KMBC-TV.

KCWE-DT2
On March 3, 2009, KCWE launched a digital subchannel on virtual channel 29.2, initially serving as an affiliate of This TV, through an affiliation agreement between Hearst Television and network co-parent Metro-Goldwyn-Mayer (which handled affiliate distribution on behalf of original managing partner Weigel Broadcasting). On January 2, 2015, through a three-station agreement between Hearst and network parents Weigel and Fox Television Stations, the subchannel became an affiliate of Movies!, a similarly formatted network that mainly airs feature films from the 20th Century Fox library; the switch displaced This TV—which Hearst had been phasing out from its stations starting in 2011, in favor of MeTV and Movies!—from the market for six months until Fox affiliate WDAF-TV (whose parent company, Tribune Broadcasting, assumed Weigel's ownership interest in This TV in November 2013) took over the affiliation through a newly created tertiary subchannel on June 22. On September 1, 2018, Movies! was replaced by the Justice Network.

Programming
Syndicated programs broadcast on KCWE include The Big Bang Theory, Two and a Half Men, Judge Jerry, Maury and The Steve Wilkos Show, among others.

As it is a sister station to KMBC, the station may take on responsibility of running ABC network programs in the event that KMBC is unable to carry them because of extended breaking news or severe weather coverage, or commitments to broadcasts of sporting events.

Sports programming
On February 6, 2010, Hearst Television announced a broadcasting agreement with the Kansas City Wizards (now Sporting Kansas City), which would give KCWE the local broadcast television rights to regular season games from the Major League Soccer (MLS) club that are not broadcast nationally over-the-air or on cable television, and its pre-game and post-game shows beginning with the team's 2010 season. The deal also allowed channel 29 the rights to carry team-focused specials during the regular season. Independent station KMCI took over the local television rights to the renamed Sporting Kansas City, beginning with the team's 2014 season.

Newscasts
, KMBC-TV produces 17 hours of locally produced newscasts each week for KCWE (with three hours each weekday and one hour each on Saturdays and Sundays).

Despite being operated by KMBC, Channel 9 did not produce any local newscasts for KCWB/KCWE for much of the station's history under Hearst management. KMBC station management explained its reasoning for not expanding its news offerings to channel 29 as a concern that adding news programming to KCWE would result in a "cannibalizing" of KMBC's audience. This would change on March 3, 2008, when KMBC began producing a two-hour extension of its morning newscast for the station, under the title KMBC 9 FirstNews on KCWE, which airs weekdays from 7:00 to 9:00 a.m. and has been broadcast in high definition since its premiere. In addition to airing opposite Good Morning America on KMBC, the program competes against the third and fourth full hours of Fox affiliate WDAF-TV's 6½-hour in-house morning newscast, which has been the ratings leader in the time slot since the program expanded into the time period upon Channel 4's switch from NBC to Fox in September 1994. FirstNews on KCWE would gain additional competition on February 7, 2011, when KCTV began producing an hour-long extension of its morning newscast, then titled More in the Morning, for MyNetworkTV-affiliated sister station KSMO (that program ended on December 30 of that year, amid low ratings).

On September 14, 2010, KMBC debuted a half-hour prime time newscast at 9:00 p.m. for Channel 29, titled KMBC 9 News at 9:00 on KCWE. Originally debuting as a weeknight-only program, it became the competitor to two existing nightly prime time newscasts on other area stations; its strongest competition is WDAF-TV's in-house 9:00 p.m. newscast, a one-hour program which has been the leader in the time period since it launched upon Channel 4's 1994 affiliation switch; it also competes against a half-hour newscast on MyNetworkTV affiliate KSMO that sister station KCTV has produced since shortly after the Meredith Corporation took ownership of KSMO in October 2005. The newscast includes a commercial-free block leading off the broadcast, featuring the day's top headlines and an updated weather forecast segment during the first nine minutes of the program (a play on its sister station's channel number, and modeled after the Eleven @ 11:00 late news format).

KMBC/KCWE station management cited The CW's growing ratings (even though the network has typically placed fifth or sixth, depending on the ratings strength of the Spanish-language Univision network, nationally since its launch) behind its decision to launch the program. The weeknight editions of the newscast would eventually be expanded to one hour on April 25, 2016; the weekend editions remain a half-hour in length, with off-network syndicated sitcoms filling the remainder of the time period.

Technical information

Subchannels
The station's digital channel is multiplexed:

Analog-to-digital conversion
KCWE signed on its digital signal on UHF channel 31 on July 1, 2002. The station shut down its analog signal, over UHF channel 29, on December 15, 2008—two months before the originally scheduled date of February 17, 2009 for full-power stations to transition from analog to digital broadcasts—in order to accommodate the move of sister station KMBC-TV's digital allotment to channel 29. The station's digital signal remained on its pre-transition UHF channel 31. Through the use of PSIP, digital television receivers display the station's virtual channel as its former UHF analog channel 29.

References

External links

Television stations in the Kansas City metropolitan area
Television channels and stations established in 1996
The CW affiliates
True Crime Network affiliates
Twist (TV network) affiliates
Hearst Television
1996 establishments in Missouri
Sporting Kansas City broadcasters
Major League Soccer over-the-air television broadcasters